The 2013–14 NCAA football bowl games were a series of college football bowl games. They concluded the 2013 NCAA Division I FBS football season, and included 35 team-competitive games and three all-star games (down from four as the Texas vs the Nation game was cancelled for this season). The games began on Saturday December 21, 2013 and, aside from the all-star games, ended with the 2014 BCS National Championship at the Rose Bowl in Pasadena that was played on January 6, 2014.

The total of 35 team-competitive bowls was unchanged from the previous year. While bowl games had been the purview of only the very best teams for nearly a century, this was the eighth consecutive year that teams with non-winning seasons participated in bowl games. To fill the 70 available bowl slots, a total of eight teams (11% of all participants) with non-winning seasons participated in bowl games—all eight had a .500 (6–6) season.

Schedule
The 2013–14 bowl season served as the last for the Bowl Championship Series (BCS) format.  Starting in 2014–15 a new system, the College Football Playoff, was used.

The 2013–2014 bowl game schedule, with 70 teams to compete in 35 bowls, was announced in May 2013.  All bowl game participants were selected by December 8, 2013.

Note: All times are EST (UTC−5).  Rankings from final BCS poll.

Non-BCS games

BCS Games

Post BCS all-star games

Bowl Challenge Cup standings

* Sun Belt does not meet minimum game requirement of three teams needed for a conference to be eligible.

Selection of the teams

To play in a bowl game, a college football team must qualify to do so according to the NCAA rules of bowl eligibility.

As in the 2010, 2011, and 2012 seasons, initial bowl eligibility would go to teams with no lower than a non-losing record (6–6) for the season.  On August 2, 2012, the NCAA Division I Board of Directors approved a significant change to the process to determine bowl eligible teams, going so far as to potentially allow 5–7 teams to go to a bowl, in case there were not enough regular bowl-eligible teams to fill every game.

The easing of the bowl eligibility rules resulted in a record number of teams, 79 versus the 71 or 72 of the past few seasons, being deemed eligible for selection to a 2013–14 bowl game.  The easing of rules to include teams with losing records and teams from the lower Football Championship Subdivision (FCS), will carry extra importance starting in the 2014–15 bowl season, when the number of bowl games will increase to 39—requiring 78 eligible teams.

If a bowl has one or more conferences/teams unable to meet their contractual commitments and there are no available bowl-eligible teams, the open spots can be filled – by the particular bowl's sponsoring agencies – as follows:

 Teams finishing with an above .500 record, that is, 7–5. In case of two teams with identical record, the team with a .500 or above in conference play, AND winning percentage in a) FIRST non-conference Road games against i) BCS conference opponents, ii) Division I non BCS conference opponents, b) SECOND non-conference Neutral-site games  against iii) BCS conference opponents, iv) Division I non BCS conference opponents, c) THIRD non-conference  Home games against v) BCS conference opponents, vi) Division I non BCS conference opponents, and last, games at home against lower division opponents.
 Teams finishing 6–6 with one win against a team from the lower Football Championship Subdivision (FCS), regardless of whether that FCS school meets NCAA scholarship requirements. Until now, an FCS win counted only if that opponent met the scholarship requirements—specifically, that school had to award at least 90% of the FCS maximum of 63 scholarship equivalents over a two-year period. In the 2013 season, programs in four FCS conferences cannot meet the 90% requirement (56.7 equivalents)—the Ivy League, which prohibits all athletic scholarships; the Pioneer Football League, which does not currently award football scholarships; the Patriot League, which only began awarding football scholarships in the 2012 season and had a limit of 30 equivalents in the 2013 season; and the Northeast Conference, which limits football scholarships to 40 equivalents.
 6–6 teams with two wins over FCS schools.
 6–7 teams that normally play a 13-team schedule, such as Hawaii's home opponents. Although Hawaii normally plays a 13-game schedule, it is only playing 12 games this season.
 FCS teams who are in the final year of the two-year FBS transition process, if they have at least a 6–6 record.
 Finally, 5–7 teams that have a top-5 Academic Progress Rate (APR) score. This was later adjusted to allow other 5–7 teams to be selected thereafter—in order of their APR.

Under a rule change approved by the NCAA Legislative Council on May 3, 2013, teams that enter a conference championship game with a 6–6 record, with no more than one win over an FCS school, are bowl-eligible regardless of the result of the championship game, without the team having to seek an NCAA waiver.

Bowl Championship Series
Ten teams were selected for the Bowl Championship Series:

Conference Champions
American: UCF
ACC: Florida State
Big 12: Baylor
Big Ten: Michigan State
Pac-12:  Stanford
SEC: Auburn

At-large selections
Alabama (SEC)
Clemson (ACC)
Ohio State (Big Ten)
Oklahoma (Big 12)

BCS top 25 teams

Teams that became bowl eligible
 American (5) : Cincinnati, Houston, Louisville, UCF (Champions), Rutgers
 ACC (11) : Boston College, Clemson, Duke (ACC Coastal Division Champions), Florida State (ACC Atlantic Division Champions, Champions), Georgia Tech, Maryland, Miami (FL), North Carolina, Pittsburgh, Syracuse, Virginia Tech
 Big Ten (7) : Iowa, Michigan, Michigan State (Big Ten Legends Division Champions, Champions), Minnesota, Nebraska, Ohio State (Big Ten Leaders Division Champions), Wisconsin
 Big 12 (6) : Baylor (Champions), Kansas State, Oklahoma, Oklahoma State, Texas, Texas Tech
 Conference USA (7) : East Carolina, Florida Atlantic, Marshall (C-USA East Division Champions), Middle Tennessee, North Texas, Rice (Champions, C-USA West Division Champions), Tulane
 Independents (3) : BYU, Navy, Notre Dame
 MAC (7) : Ball State, Bowling Green (MAC East Division Champions, Champions), Buffalo, Central Michigan, NIU (MAC West Division Champions), Ohio, Toledo
 Mountain West (7) : Boise State, Colorado State, Fresno State (Mountain West West Division Champions, Champions), San Diego State, San Jose State, UNLV, Utah State (Mountain West Mountain Division Champions)
 Pac-12 (9) : Arizona, Arizona State (Pac-12 South Division Champions), Oregon (Pac-12 North Division Co-Champions), Oregon State, Stanford (Pac-12 North Division Co-Champions, Champions), UCLA, USC, Washington, Washington State
 SEC (10) : Alabama (SEC West Division Co-Champions), Auburn (SEC West Division Co-Champions, Champions), Georgia, LSU, Mississippi State, Missouri (SEC East Division Champions), Ole Miss, South Carolina, Texas A&M, Vanderbilt
 Sun Belt (7) : Arkansas State (Co-Champions), Louisiana–Lafayette (Co-Champions), Louisiana–Monroe, South Alabama, Texas State, Troy, Western Kentucky

Number of bowl berths available: 70
Number of teams bowl eligible: 79

The easing of the bowl eligibility rules, to include teams with non-losing (6–6) or even losing records, resulted in a record number of teams – 79 versus the 71 or 72 of the past few seasons – being deemed eligible for selection to a 2013–14 bowl game.

Nine eligible teams did not receive a bowl invitation, including two with winning records: Western Kentucky (8–4), Toledo (7–5), Central Michigan (6–6), Florida Atlantic (6–6), Louisiana-Monroe (6–6), San Jose State (6–6), South Alabama (6–6), Texas State (6–6), and Troy (6–6).

Teams that did not become bowl eligible
 American (5) : Connecticut, Memphis, South Florida, SMU, Temple
 ACC (3) : NC State, Virginia, Wake Forest
 Big Ten (5) : Illinois, Indiana, Northwestern, Penn State (via NCAA sanctions), Purdue
 Big 12 (4) : Iowa State, Kansas, TCU, West Virginia
 Conference USA (7) : FIU, Louisiana Tech, Southern Miss, Tulsa, UAB, UTEP,  UTSA (via transition)
 Independents (3) : Army, Idaho, New Mexico State
 MAC (6) : Akron, Eastern Michigan, Kent State, Miami (OH), UMass, Western Michigan
 Mountain West (5) : Air Force, Hawaii, Nevada, New Mexico, Wyoming
 Pac-12 (3) : California, Colorado, Utah
 SEC (4) : Arkansas, Florida, Kentucky, Tennessee
 Sun Belt (1) : Georgia State
Number of teams bowl ineligible: 46

Changes for 2014–15
Starting in 2014–15 a new system, the College Football Playoff, has been used to determine the national champion.

The new format uses a committee of 13 people to select and seed the top 12 teams.  These teams are paired in six of the ten oldest bowl games—the Rose, Sugar, Orange, Cotton, Peach and Fiesta bowls.  These games have been marketed as the "New Year's Six", with three bowls played daily, typically on consecutive days around New Year's Day.

Within this New Year's Six format, the top four seeded teams are paired in two national semi-finals, followed by a national championship game played on the first Monday that is six or more days after the semifinals, at a neutral site.  The two semi-finals will rotate each year, first at the Rose and Sugar bowls, then the Orange and Fiesta bowls, then the Cotton and Peach bowls.

In addition, the number of bowls expanded to 39 games in 2014–15, with four new games – the Camellia Bowl, scheduled for the Cramton Bowl in Montgomery, Alabama pitting the Sun Belt against the MAC; the Bahamas Bowl, played in Nassau between the MAC and the American Athletic Conference; the Miami Beach Bowl, played in Marlins Park with an AAC team as host; and the Boca Raton Bowl, played at FAU Stadium, with a third MAC team taking on a team from Conference USA.  The increase to 76 teams (38 bowls + national championship played by semi-final bowl winners) in bowl play required the easing of bowl eligibility rules, allowing teams with losing records or teams in the lower FCS to be deemed eligible for invitation to a bowl game.

Notes

References

Further reading